NGC 117 is a lenticular galaxy with a magnitude of 14.3 in the constellation Cetus. NGC 117 is its New General Catalogue designation. It was discovered on September 13, 1863 by the astronomer Albert Marth.

See also 
List of NGC objects

References

External links 
 

0117
Cetus (constellation)
Lenticular galaxies